Nakling is a surname. Notable people with the surname include:

Hilde Nakling (born 1982), Norwegian shooter 
Vidar Nakling (born 1950), Norwegian shooter